The 2019 season was the Philadelphia Eagles' 87th in the National Football League (NFL) and fourth under head coach Doug Pederson. The Eagles acquired many key players, including wide receiver DeSean Jackson, running back Jordan Howard and defensive tackle Malik Jackson. With these offseason moves, the Eagles were listed as Super Bowl contenders. However, inconsistent play aided by injuries on both sides of the ball plagued the Eagles early in the year. Despite a 5–7 start, the Eagles won their last four games against divisional opponents and matched their 9–7 record from 2018. The Eagles clinched the NFC East division title (the second time in the Pederson/Wentz era), but were defeated by the Seattle Seahawks in the Wild Card round by a score of 17–9.

Free agents

Signings

Departures

Trades
 March 13: The Eagles traded a sixth-round pick in the 2019 NFL Draft to the Tampa Bay Buccaneers for WR DeSean Jackson and a seventh-round pick in the 2020 NFL Draft.
 March 14: The Eagles traded DE Michael Bennett and a seventh-round pick in the 2020 NFL Draft to the New England Patriots for a fifth-round pick in the 2020 NFL Draft.
 March 28: The Eagles traded a sixth-round pick in the 2020 NFL Draft that could potentially become a fifth-round pick to the Chicago Bears for RB Jordan Howard.
 April 27: The Eagles traded a seventh-round pick in the 2019 NFL Draft to the Indianapolis Colts for DT Hassan Ridgeway.
 August 9: The Eagles traded OT Ryan Bates to the Buffalo Bills for DE Eli Harold.
 August 22: The Eagles traded DT Bruce Hector to the Arizona Cardinals for S Rudy Ford.
 September 30: The Eagles traded S Johnathan Cyprien and a seventh-round pick in the 2020 NFL Draft to the Atlanta Falcons for LB Duke Riley and a sixth-round pick in the 2020 NFL Draft.

NFL Draft

Notes
 The Eagles acquired an additional second-round selection (No. 53 overall) as part of a trade that sent their  first- and fourth-round selections to the Baltimore Ravens.
 The Eagles traded their third-round selection (No. 88 overall) to the Detroit Lions in exchange for wide receiver Golden Tate.
 The Eagles acquired an additional seventh-round selection in a  trade that sent guard Allen Barbre to the Denver Broncos. This selection was later traded to the New England Patriots in exchange for the Patriots' seventh-round selection.
 The Eagles traded their sixth-round selection (No. 208 overall) to the Tampa Bay Buccaneers in exchange for wide receiver DeSean Jackson and Tampa's  seventh-round selection.
 The Eagles traded their first-round selection (No. 25 overall) as well as a fourth-round selection (No. 127 overall) and a sixth-round selection (No. 197 overall) to the Baltimore Ravens in exchange for their first-round selection (No. 22 overall)
 The Eagles traded their fifth-round selection (No. 163 overall) to the New England Patriots in exchange for a fifth-round selection (No. 167 overall) and a seventh-round selection (No. 246 overall)
 The Eagles traded their seventh-round selection acquired from the New England Patriots (No. 246 overall) to the Indianapolis Colts in exchange for defensive tackle Hassan Ridgeway.
 As the result of a negative differential of free-agent signings and departures that the Eagles experienced during the  free agency period, the team is projected to receive three compensatory selections for the 2019 draft. Exact numbers of the selections from rounds 3–7 will be determined when compensatory selections are awarded at the NFL's annual spring owners' meetings.

Staff

Roster

Preseason

Regular season

Schedule

Note: Intra-division opponents are in bold text.

Game summaries

Week 1: vs. Washington Redskins

Week 2: at Atlanta Falcons

Week 3: vs. Detroit Lions

Week 4: at Green Bay Packers

Week 5: vs. New York Jets

With the win, the Eagles improved to 11–0 in their all-time series against the New York Jets.

Week 6: at Minnesota Vikings

Week 7: at Dallas Cowboys

Week 8: at Buffalo Bills

Week 9: vs. Chicago Bears

Week 11: vs. New England Patriots

Week 12: vs. Seattle Seahawks

Week 13: at Miami Dolphins

In one of the most embarrassing road losses in franchise history, the Eagles blew a 28–14 3rd quarter lead and lost to the Miami Dolphins 37–31. They allowed over 365 total yards of offense, and with this loss, tied their loss total from the previous season.

Week 14: vs. New York Giants

Week 14 featured the Eagles facing the rival New York Giants, lead by Eli Manning, who was taking over for an injured Daniel Jones. Following a scoreless first quarter, Manning opened the scoring with a 35-yard touchdown pass to Darius Slayton, giving New York a 7–0 lead. After the teams traded field goals, Manning would throw another touchdown pass to Slayton, this time from 55 yards, to build the Giants' lead to 17–3 before halftime. However, Philadelphia's defense would stifle Manning in the second half, forcing three-and-outs on four of six possessions and allowing just 30 yards total offense. The Eagles offense would step up and score 14 unanswered points over the final two-quarters to force overtime. After the Eagles won the overtime coin toss, they drove down the field and won the game on Carson Wentz's second touchdown pass of the night to Zach Ertz. With the comeback win, the Eagles improved to 6–7 on the year. Further, the Eagles won their sixth straight against the Giants, and took the lead in the all-time series for the first time in franchise history. It also marked the first time since 2006 an Eagles-Giants game would go to overtime.

Week 15: at Washington Redskins

Week 16: vs. Dallas Cowboys

In desperate need of a win to stay alive in the playoff race, an injury-ravaged Eagles team got revenge on the Cowboys after losing in Week 7 to them. Not only did this snap a 4-game losing streak to the Cowboys, but this resulted in the Eagles taking the lead in the NFC East for the first time all season. Furthermore, the victory improved Philadelphia to 8–7. Now all the Eagles needed was to either beat the NY Giants the very next week or have the Cowboys lose to the Redskins.

Week 17: at New York Giants

The Eagles clinched their second NFC East division title in three years with a win over the New York Giants, their seventh straight in the series dating back to the 2016 season.

Standings

Division

Conference

Postseason

Schedule

Game summaries

NFC Wild Card Playoffs: vs. (5) Seattle Seahawks

The Eagles season ended with their first loss at home since Week 12 of the regular season, which was, coincidentally, also a 17–9 home loss to the Seahawks. They failed to score a touchdown for the first time since Week 17 of the 2017 season. Carson Wentz left the game in the first quarter with a concussion following a controversial hit by Jadeveon Clowney. No penalty was called on the play, and Wentz was later ruled out for the game. This was the Eagles' third straight home Wild Card playoff loss.

References

External links
 

Philadelphia
Philadelphia Eagles seasons
Philadelphia Eagles
NFC East championship seasons